My Old School is a 2013 historical documentary created by Jason Allard and Scott Gabrielson.

Plot 

The film traces in history of the largest abandoned school in New England, located in Woonsocket, Rhode Island. The historic building, constructed	in 1914, housed thousands of students over the years as	Woonsocket High	School, then as	Woonsocket Middle School. My Old School features a series of interviews with former teachers, faculty, and city officials along with historical photographs and footage from inside the abandoned school.

The film premiered to a local audience in Woonsocket, Rhode Island on October 5, 2013. It premiered on PBS on March 6, 2014.

References

External links 
 Official Website
 

2013 films
2013 documentary films
American documentary films
American independent films
Films set in Rhode Island
Woonsocket, Rhode Island
2010s English-language films
2010s American films